Ryan McKee (born November 4, 1986 in Pine Bluff, Arkansas) is an American football offensive tackle who is currently a free agent. He was signed by the New York Jets as an undrafted free agent in 2009. He played college football at Southern Mississippi. McKee also spent 3 games on the St. Louis Rams active roster in 2009, as well as being on the team's practice squad from 2010 to 2012.

Early years 
McKee attended Daphne High School, Alabama, and was a two-year letter winner there. He finished senior season without allowing a sack all year and was voted All-district and All-county. The year before, as a junior, helped the team to a 14-1 record and a berth in the state championship game.

College career 
McKee started three consecutive seasons at right tackle for Southern Mississippi and graduated in December 2008, with a degree in business administration.

In 2008 McKee was a Second-team All-Conference USA offensive tackle. He helped the team run for over 2,000 yards in three straight seasons and was credited with more than 80 knockdowns in 2008. In 2007, he started in all 13 games at right tackle in 2007 and did not allow a sack all season, while tallying two pancake blocks and a team-best 61 knockdowns. He helped Southern Miss set the season record for total offense (4,727) as the Golden Eagles had a 1,000 rusher and 2,000 yards rushing for the second-straight season. In 2006, he helped pave the way for Southern Miss' first 1,000-yard rusher since 2002  and had 58 knockdowns during the campaign, five pancakes and allowed just four sacks. In 2005, he played in three games and finished the year with three knockdowns and one pancake and did not allow a sack.

Professional career

Pre-draft

New York Jets
McKee was signed by the New York Jets as an undrafted free agent following the 2009 NFL Draft. He was waived on September 5, 2009 and re-signed to the practice squad on September 7, 2009. He was promoted from the practice squad on December 12, 2009 however he was waived two days later.

St. Louis Rams
McKee was claimed off waivers by the St. Louis Rams on December 15, 2009 and was on the team's roster for the final 3 games, though he was only active for one game. McKee spent the 2010, 2011, and 2012 seasons on the Rams practice squad but did return to the team the following season.

Kansas City Chiefs
On May 27, 2014, the Kansas City Chiefs signed McKee. The Chiefs waived McKee on August 26, 2014.

References

External links
St. Louis Rams bio
Southern Miss Golden Eagles bio

1986 births
Living people
Sportspeople from Pine Bluff, Arkansas
Players of American football from Arkansas
American football offensive tackles
Southern Miss Golden Eagles football players
New York Jets players
St. Louis Rams players